Alexander Evgenyevich Baburin (Aleksandr Yevgen'yevich Baburin; born 19 February 1967) is a Russian-Irish grandmaster of chess. He was born in Gorky, and has been living in Dublin, Ireland since 1993. He is editor-in-chief of the e-mail distributed chess newspaper Chess Today and is a coach and author.

Chess career 
Baburin became Irish champion in 2008, the first year in which he entered the competition. He cited past comments from fellow Irish players as the reason he had not entered previously. His participation in the Irish Olympiad team has generated some controversy, being non-native Irish. Baburin is known for giving talks about chess at many venues throughout Ireland. Baburin is currently Ireland's only chess grandmaster, a title he earned in 1996. Baburin is on the Irish chess team, the highest-ranked member. One of Baburin's most famous victories is against Veselin Topalov in a four on one simultaneous exhibition.

In March 2022, Baburin won the John Bolger Cup in Dublin, edging out Vladyslav Larkin and Jacob Flynn on tie-break after all scored 4/5.

References

External links

Baburin's page at Grandmaster Square
Review of Baburin's book "Winning Pawn Structures" 
Chess Today
Chess Ireland

1967 births
Living people
Chess grandmasters
Chess Olympiad competitors
Russian chess players
Irish chess players
Irish writers
Russian chess writers
Sportspeople from Nizhny Novgorod
Russian emigrants to Ireland